Slow Surrender is a 2001 Croatian film directed by Bruno Gamulin, starring Filip Šovagović, Sven Medvešek and Lucija Šerbedžija. It is based on a novel of the same name by Goran Tribuson.

Plot
Petar Gorjan (Filip Šovagović) is a cynical 40-year-old PR man who is profoundly unhappy with his life: he betrayed the ideals of his youth, and has a failed marriage behind him. While driving his car to Dubrovnik to visit his ex-wife (Anja Šovagović Despot) and child, he meets Lukas (Sven Medvešek), a rather eccentric young man, and Mala (Lucija Šerbedžija), a vagrant girl. They join him against his will and proceed to introduce additional chaos into his life...

References

External links
 

2001 films
Croatian drama films
2000s Croatian-language films
Films based on Croatian novels